The Seng Khasi movement, also known as the Khasi Students' Union, is a social and political movement that originated in the Khasi Hills region of the Indian state of Meghalaya. The movement was founded in the 1899 by a group of Khasi who were concerned about the loss of traditional Khasi culture and values due to the influence of British colonial rule and Christian missionaries.

The Seng Khasi movement has had a long and tumultuous history. It began as a cultural and social organization, with a focus on preserving and promoting Khasi language, literature, and art. However, as the movement grew in strength and influence, it became more politically active, advocating for the rights and interests of the Khasi people. In the early 1960s, the Seng Khasi movement played a significant role in the formation of the state of Meghalaya, which was created out of the former state of Assam. The movement also played a key role in the establishment of the Autonomous District Councils, which were created to give the Khasi people more control over their own affairs.

In recent years, the Seng Khasi movement has continued to be active in advocating for the rights of the Khasi people, including their land rights, cultural rights, and political representation. The movement has also worked to promote education and development in the Khasi Hills region. Despite its many accomplishments, the Seng Khasi movement has faced its share of challenges and controversies. It has been criticized for its sometimes confrontational approach to political issues, and for its alleged involvement in incidents of violence and intimidation.

Despite these challenges, the Seng Khasi movement remains an important and influential force in the Khasi Hills region, and continues to play a key role in shaping the political and social landscape of Meghalaya. The movement has historically supported greater autonomy and self-governance for the Khasi Hills region and its people. While the Autonomous District Councils have provided some degree of autonomy to the Khasi Hills region, the Seng Khasi movement has continued to push for greater autonomy and self-governance. Some members of the movement have called for the establishment of a separate state for the Khasi people within India, while others have advocated for the creation of a separate country for the Khasi people (Hynniewtrep National Liberation Council). However, these calls for greater autonomy or independence have not gained widespread support among the Khasi people, and the Seng Khasi movement has not actively pursued these goals. Instead, the movement has focused on advocating for the rights and interests of the Khasi people within the framework of the Indian constitutional system.

References 

Politics of Meghalaya
Khasi people